Trifurcula is a genus of moths of the family Nepticulidae. For the Triassic aged ray-fin "Glaucolepis" Stensiö, 1921 (non Glaucolepis Braun, 1917) see Pteronisculus.

Selected species

Trifurcula aerifica (Meyrick, 1915)
Trifurcula albiflorella Klimesch, 1978
Trifurcula alypella Klimesch, 1975
Trifurcula andalusica Z. & A. Lastuvka, 2007
Trifurcula anthyllidella Klimesch, 1975
Trifurcula argentosa (Puplesis & Robinson, 2000)
Trifurcula aurella Rebel, 1933
Trifurcula austriaca van Nieukerken, 1990
Trifurcula baldensis A. & Z. Lastuvka, 2005
Trifurcula barbertonensis Scoble, 1980
Trifurcula beirnei Puplesis, 1984
Trifurcula bleonella (Chretien, 1904)
Trifurcula bupleurella (Chretien, 1907)
Trifurcula calycotomella A. & Z. Lastuvka, 1997
Trifurcula chamaecytisi Z. & A. Lastuvka, 1994
Trifurcula corleyi Z. & A. Lastuvka, 2007
Trifurcula coronillae van Nieukerken, 1990
Trifurcula corothamni Z. & A. Lastuvka, 1994
Trifurcula cryptella (Stainton, 1856)
Trifurcula cytisanthi A. & Z. Lastuvka, 2005
Trifurcula etnensis A. & Z. Lastuvka, 2005
Trifurcula eurema (Tutt, 1899)
Trifurcula globulariae Klimesch, 1975
Trifurcula graeca Z. & A. Lastuvka, 1998
Trifurcula hamirella (Chrétien, 1915)  (=Trifurcula saturejae (Parenti, 1963))
Trifurcula headleyella (Stainton, 1854)
Trifurcula helladica Z. & A. Lastuvka, 2007
Trifurcula iberica van Nieukerken, 1990
Trifurcula immundella (Zeller, 1839)
Trifurcula istriae A. & Z. Lastuvka, 2000
Trifurcula josefklimeschi van Nieukerken, 1990
Trifurcula kalavritana Z. & A. Lastuvka, 1998
Trifurcula lavandulae Z. & A. Lastuvka, 2007
Trifurcula liskai A. & Z. Lastuvka, 2000
Trifurcula luteola van Nieukerken, 1990
Trifurcula macedonica Z. & A. Lastuvka, 1998
Trifurcula magna A. & Z. Lastuvka, 1997
Trifurcula manygoza van Nieukerken, A. & Z. Lastuvka, 2007
Trifurcula melanoptera van Nieukerken & Puplesis, 1991
Trifurcula micromeriae (Walsingham, 1908)
Trifurcula montana Z. Lastuvka, A. Lastuvka & Van Nieukerken, 2007
Trifurcula moravica Z. & A. Lastuvka, 1994
Trifurcula oishiella Matsumura, 1931
Trifurcula orientella Klimesch, 1953
Trifurcula ortneri (Klimesch, 1951)
Trifurcula pallidella (Duponchel, 1843)
Trifurcula pederi Z. & A. Lastuvka, 2007
Trifurcula peloponnesica van Nieukerken, 2007
Trifurcula pullus Scoble, 1980 
Trifurcula puplesisi van Nieukerken, 1990
Trifurcula raikhonae (Puplesis, 1985)
Trifurcula ridiculosa (Walsingham, 1908)
Trifurcula rosmarinella (Chretien, 1914)
Trifurcula rusticula (Meyrick, 1916)
Trifurcula saccharella (Braun, 1912)
Trifurcula salicinae Klimesch, 1975
Trifurcula salvifoliae Z. & A. Lastuvka, 2007
Trifurcula sanctaecrucis (Walsingham, 1908)
Trifurcula sanctibenedicti Klimesch, 1979
Trifurcula serotinella Herrich-Schaffer, 1855
Trifurcula silviae van Nieukerken, 1990
Trifurcula sinica (Yang, 1989)
Trifurcula squamatella Stainton, 1849
Trifurcula stoechadella Klimesch, 1975
Trifurcula subnitidella (Duponche, 1843)
Trifurcula teucriella (Chretien, 1914)
Trifurcula thymi (Szocs, 1965)
Trifurcula trasaghica A. & Z. Lastuvka, 2005
Trifurcula trilobella Klimesch, 1978
Trifurcula victoris van Nieukerken, 1990
Trifurcula zollikofferiela (Chrétien, 1914)

External links

 Fauna Europaea

Monotrysia genera
Nepticulidae
Taxa named by Philipp Christoph Zeller